Olivier de Clisson most often refers to Olivier V de Clisson (1336–1407), a Breton soldier during the Hundred Years' War.

It may also refer to other members of the same family:

Olivier I de Clisson (d. 1262)
Olivier II de Clisson (d. 1307)
Olivier III de Clisson (d. 1320)
Olivier IV de Clisson (d. 1343)